A Commerce minister (sometimes business minister, industry minister, trade minister or international trade minister) is a position in many governments that is responsible for regulating external trade and promoting economic growth (commercial policy). In many countries, this role is separate from a finance minister, who has more budgetary responsibilities.

Notable examples are:
 : Minister of Commerce and Industries (Afghanistan)
 : Minister for Trade
 : Bangladesh Commerce Minister
 : Ministry of Development, Industry and Foreign Trade (Brazil)
 : Ministry of Finance and Economy
 : Ministry of Commerce (Cambodia)
 : Minister of International Trade
 : Minister of Commerce (People's Republic of China)
 : Ministry of Economic and Business Affairs
 : Ministry of Industry and Commerce
 : Commissioner for Trade
 :Minister of Commerce (France)
 : Federal Ministry for Economic Affairs and Climate Action
 : Secretary for Commerce and Economic Development
 : Minister of Commerce (Iceland)
 : Minister of Commerce and Industry
 : Minister of Trade
 : Minister for Commerce reestablished 2022
 : Minister for Enterprise, Trade and Employment
: Minister of Trade
: Industry, Trade and Labour Minister of Israel
 : Minister of Economy and Finance
 : Ministry of Economy, Trade and Industry
 : Ministry of Trade, Industry and Energy
 : Ministry of Economy
 : Ministry of Economy
 : Ministry of International Trade and Industry
 : Minister of Economic Affairs, Agriculture and Innovation
 : Minister of Commerce and Consumer Affairs
 : Minister of Commerce
 : Ministry of Foreign Commerce and Tourism
 : Department of Trade and Industry
 : Minister of Economy, Commerce and Business Environment (Romania)
 : Minister of Trade, Industry and Competition
 : Minister for Labour, Commerce and Industries (Tonga)
: Ministry of Trade
 : Ministry of Commerce of the USSR
 : Ministry of Industry, Trade and Tourism
 : Federal Department of Economic Affairs
 : Ministry of Commerce
 : Secretary of State for Business and Trade 
 Northern Ireland: 
 Minister for the Economy
 Minister of Commerce (Northern Ireland)
 : Secretary of Commerce
: Executive Director of the Commerce Department
 : Minister of Industry and Trade

References

See also 

 Ministry of Commerce
 Industry minister

 
Commerce